For the purpose of regional broadcasting on NRK, Norway is divided into 11 districts. 10 of these districts follow county boundaries and provide services in the Norwegian language, while one overlaps the other districts and provides services in the Sami languages. Each district includes one district office along with several subordinate local offices.

Regional broadcasting output generally comes from the district offices, though some of the local offices contain newsrooms and production facilities able to supplement output from the district office or produce separate programming altogether. Regional services include the following radio and TV output:

Radio
NRK's P1 radio channel carries regional programming on Mondays through Fridays from 6.03 to 9.00 local time (including national news summaries on the hour and half hour) and from 14.03 to 17.00 (with national news at 15.00 and 16.00), as well as two-minute regional news updates each hour from 9.03 to 16.03 inclusive. On Saturdays there are two-minute regional bulletins at 8.03, 9.03, and 10.03. These programmes come from 15 different offices (including one for the capital). 

P1 is broadcast digitally (via DAB+ and satellite) as well as being available on cable and via the internet. Analogue broadcasting on FM – hitherto the channel's main method of transmission – ended in 2017.

Television
NRK1 carries regional news, produced at the district offices, Mondays through Thursdays from 19.45–20.00 and 22.55–23.00 and Fridays from 19.30-19.40. Except during the summer holiday period, all regional news programmes are repeated nationwide in a 150-minute sequence on NRK2 overnight as well as in the later part of the following morning.

Norwegian language districts

Sami language district

References